Per Henry Dahl (21 March 1916 – 17 February 1989), nicknamed Peddal, was a Norwegian ice hockey player.

He was born in Høvik in Bærum, Norway and represented the club Bærum SK. He played for the Norwegian national ice hockey team, and  competed at the 1952 Winter Olympics in Oslo.

References

External links

1916 births
1989 deaths
Sportspeople from Bærum
Ice hockey players at the 1952 Winter Olympics
Norwegian ice hockey players
Olympic ice hockey players of Norway